The Michigan Wolverines women's basketball statistical leaders are individual statistical leaders of the Michigan Wolverines women's basketball program in various categories, including points, rebounds, assists, steals, and blocks. Within those areas, the lists identify single-game, single-season, and career leaders. The Wolverines represent the University of Michigan in the NCAA's Big Ten Conference.

Michigan began competing in intercollegiate basketball in 1973. The NCAA did not officially record assists as a stat until the 1983–84 season, and blocks and steals until the 1985–86 season, but Michigan's record books includes players in these stats before these seasons. Stats updated as of the end of the 2021–22 season.

Scoring

Rebounds

Assists

Steals

Blocks

Three-point field goals

Three-pointers made

References

Michigan
Statistical
Michigan Wolverines basketball statistical leaders